The 9th Military Region of Vietnam People's Army, is directly under the Ministry of Defence of Vietnam, tasked to organise, build, manage and command armed forces defending the Mekong Delta.  

 Command Headquarters: Cần Thơ
 Commander: Lieutenant General Nguyễn Xuân Dắt 
 Political Commissar: Major General Hồ Văn Thái
 Deputy Commander cum Chief of Staff: Senior Colonel Chiêm Thống Nhất

Agencies
 Department of Staff 
 Department of Politics 
 Division of Organisation 
 Division of Cadre 
 Division of Policy 
 Division of Propogendar and Training 
 Division of Thoughts and Culture 
 Military Court of Military Zone
 Military Procuratorate of Military Zone 
 Department of Logistics 
 Department of Technique 
 Office of Command of 9th Military Zone

Units
 Military Command of Cần Thơ Municipality
 Military Command of An Giang Province 
 Military Command of Bạc Liêu Province
 Military Command of Bến Tre Province
 Military Command of Cà Mau Province
 Military Command of Đồng Tháp Province
 Military Command of Hậu Giang Province
 Military Command of Kiên Giang Province
 Military Command of Sóc Trăng Province
 Military Command of Tiền Giang Province
 Military Command of Trà Vinh Province
 Military Command of Vĩnh Long Province
 Military School of Military Zone
 121st Military Hospital
 4th Infantry Division 
 8th Infantry Division 
 330th Infantry Division 
 25th Combat Engineer Brigade: honoured as Hero of People's Armed Forces in 2005
 6th Artillery Brigade
 226th Air Defense Artillery Brigade
 29th Signal Brigade

Successive Commander and Leadership

Commanders
 Senior Colonel Đồng Văn Cống (1964–1969), Major General (1974), Trung tướng (1980) 
 Senior Colonel Lê Đức Anh (1969–1974)  
 Lieutenant General Lê Đức Anh (1976-June 1978): Colonel General (1980), General (1984), Chief of General Staff of Vietnam People's Army (1986–1987), Minister of Defence (1987–1991), President of Vietnam (1992–1997)
 Major General Nguyễn Chánh (1978–1979): Lieutenant General (1984), Director of the General Logistics Department  
 Lieutenant General Trần Văn Nghiêm (1979–1983)  
 Lieutenant General Nguyễn Thới Bưng (1983–1986)  
 Lieutenant General Nguyễn Đệ (1986–1996)  
 Lieutenant General Nguyễn Văn Tấn (1996–2000)  
 Lieutenant General Huỳnh Tiền Phong (2000–2007)  
 Lieutenant General Trần Phi Hổ (2007–2011)
 Lieutenant General Nguyễn Phương Nam (2011–2015)
 Lieutenant General Nguyễn Hoàng Thủy (2015–2020)
 Lieutenant General Nguyễn Xuân Dắt (2020–present)

Political Commissioners, Deputy Commanders of Politics 
 Lieutenant General Nguyễn Hùng Phong 
 Major General Lê Văn Tưởng (1976–1978) 
 Major General Bùi Văn Huấn: promoted to Lieutenant General, Deputy Director of the General Political Department, member of Central Committee of the Communist Party of Vietnam 
 Lieutenant General Nguyễn Việt Quân: member of Central Committee of the Communist Party of Vietnam 
 Lieutenant General Đinh Văn Cai
 Lieutenant General Huỳnh Chiến Thắng: member of Central Committee of the Communist Party of Vietnam, then promoted to Deputy Chief of General Staff of Vietnam People's Army
 Major General Nguyễn Văn Gấu: member of Central Committee of the Communist Party of Vietnam, then promoted to Deputy Director of the General Political Department
 Major General Hồ Văn Thái

Military regions of the People's Army of Vietnam